Chan Yung-jan and Zhang Shuai were the defending champions, but neither player chose to participate this year.

The top seeds Arina Rodionova and Olga Savchuk won the title, defeating Chinese pair Han Xinyun and Zhang Kailin in the final, 4–6, 7–6(7–2), [10–6].

Seeds

Draw

References 
 Draw

Ningbo International Women's Tennis Open - Doubles
Ningbo International Women's Tennis Open